Vladimir "Vlado" Petrović-Stergiou (born January 27, 1977) is a Serbian-Greek former professional basketball player. At 6 ft 6  in (1.99 m) tall, he played at the shooting guard and small forward positions. He is also known as Vlantimir Stergiou, which is his Greek-form name.

Professional career
Petrović-Stergiou began his career with Partizan Belgrade during the 1994–95 season. He moved to Borac Čačak in 1997. He then moved to Zorka Šabac for the 1998–99 season. He then joined Aris Thessaloniki in 1999, before moving to KAO Dramas in 2001. He moved on to Cáceres in 2002, before next joining Alba Berlin in 2003.

Petrović-Stergiou next played with Breogán, whom he joined in 2004. His next playing stop was with Montepaschi Siena, whom he moved to in 2005. He then returned to play with Aris, and then next joined Paris Racing Basket. He then played with Virtus Bologna, and then with Mega. After that, his next club was Anwil Wloclawek.

Petrović-Stergiou joined Panellinios in 2008, and then moved to Iraklis in 2009. He then joined Apollon Patras, before finishing his career with Promitheas Patras.

After one season break from professional basketball, Petrović-Stergiou signed for G.N.O. Aris Nikaias in September 2020.

Awards and accomplishments
Yugoslav Cup Winner: (1995)
3× Yugoslav League Champion: (1995, 1996, 1997)
2× Greek All-Star Game: (2001, 2013)
German Cup Winner: (2003)
German League Champion: (2003)
German All-Star Game: (2004)

References

External links
Euroleague.net Profile
FIBA Europe Profile
Eurobasket.com Profile
Greek Basket League Profile 
Spanish League Profile 
Spanish League Archive Profile 
Italian League Profile 

1977 births
Living people
Alba Berlin players
Apollon Patras B.C. players
Aris B.C. players
CB Breogán players
Greek men's basketball players
Greek Basket League players
Greek expatriate basketball people in France
Greek expatriate basketball people in Germany
Greek expatriate basketball people in Spain
HANTH B.C. players
Iraklis Thessaloniki B.C. players
K.A.O.D. B.C. players
KK Borac Čačak players
KK Iva Zorka Šabac players
KK Mega Basket players
KK Partizan players
KK Włocławek players
Liga ACB players
Mens Sana Basket players
Naturalized citizens of Greece
Panellinios B.C. players
Paris Racing Basket players
Promitheas Patras B.C. players
Serbian expatriate basketball people in France
Serbian expatriate basketball people in Germany
Serbian expatriate basketball people in Greece
Serbian expatriate basketball people in Italy
Serbian expatriate basketball people in Poland
Serbian expatriate basketball people in Spain
Serbian men's basketball players
Shooting guards
Small forwards
Virtus Bologna players